James Donald Owens (March 6, 1927 – June 6, 2009) was an American football player and coach.

Owens played college football at the University of Oklahoma from 1946 to 1949, under head coach Bud Wilkinson, where he was a teammate of Darrell Royal, who, coincidentally, was the Huskies' head coach in 1956, then took the same post at Texas, allowing Owens to come to Seattle. He played a year of pro football in 1950  and then was a college assistant coach for six years under Bear Bryant at the University of Kentucky and at Texas A&M University. According to legend, after the 1956 season, when the Washington Huskies were looking for a head coach, Bryant indicated to reporters that Owens "will make a great coach for somebody some day."

In 1959 and 1960, he led Washington to back-to-back ten-win seasons and consecutive Rose Bowl wins, as well as a national championship in 1960. He also coached the Huskies to the 1964 Rose Bowl. Owens concurrently served as the athletic director at Washington from 1960 to 1969.  He was elected to the College Football Hall of Fame as a player in 1982.

Owens resigned as head coach of the Huskies following the 1974 season at the end of his last contract, a three-year deal at $33,000 per year. His later years at Washington were marred by accusations of racism and the backlash that resulted from his actions and attitudes towards black players. He was succeeded as head coach by Don James, the head coach at Kent State, who also led the Huskies for eighteen seasons. Owens later apologized for his actions as part of his acknowledgements as a statue of him was erected at Washington in 2003.

Owens died at age 82 in 2009 at his home in Bigfork, Montana.

Head coaching record

References

External links
 
 

1927 births
2009 deaths
American football ends
Baltimore Colts players
Kentucky Wildcats football coaches
Oklahoma Sooners football players
Texas A&M Aggies football coaches
Washington Huskies athletic directors
Washington Huskies football coaches
College Football Hall of Fame inductees
Sportspeople from Oklahoma City
People from Bigfork, Montana
Coaches of American football from Oklahoma
Players of American football from Oklahoma
Baltimore Colts (1947–1950) players